Texas Essential Knowledge and Skills or TEKS are the state standards for Texas public schools from kindergarten to year 12. They detail the curriculum requirements for every course. State-mandated standardized tests measure acquisition of specific knowledge and skills outlined in this curriculum. It is also used in international schools outside of Texas (see Sharon English School). The TEKS are taught to students and within the end of the year, they take a standardized test based on the TEKS called the State of Texas Assessments of Academic Readiness.

Standards 
Standards are created and agreed upon by the State Board of Education (SBOE) which is the legislative organization that forms the committee to review the TEKS.  The committee consists of members nominate educators, parents, business and industry representatives, and employers.

References

External links
 http://tea.texas.gov/index2.aspx?id=6148
 TEKS Watch

Education in Texas